"Touch Me" is a song from Australian singer/songwriter Starley, released on 9 June 2017. In an interview with auspOp in August 2017, Starley said ""Touch Me" is about being in a relationship with someone and not getting comfortable. Find out what that person likes mentally, physically, etc. and make an effort to do that. Don’t let it get boring!" 

The song is inspired by Groove Theory's 1995 single "Tell Me". Starley told amnplify "I happen to be friends with Bryce from Groove Theory and have always loved "Tell Me" so I asked him if I could create a 2017 version. With his blessing I got in the studio with my good friend and collaborator Hannibal Hector and rewrote it."

Track listing

Charts

References

2017 songs
2017 singles
Starley (singer) songs
Spinnin' Records singles
Songs written by Bryce Wilson